Dorcadion czegodaevi is a species of beetle in the family Cerambycidae. It was described by Mikhail Leontievich Danilevsky in 1992. It is known from the Caucasus.

References

czegodaevi
Beetles described in 1992